Kundgol also spelled as Kundagola is a panchayat town in Dharwad district in the Indian state of Karnataka.

Introduction

Kundgol is Located in Dharwad District of Karnataka is about 14 km south-west of Hubli and 32 km south-west of Dharwad.

This town is the birthplace of Rambhau Kundgolkar (popular as Pandit Sawai Gandharva), a well known Hindustani musician. Gangubai Hangal, Bhimsen Joshi were his disciples.

History

Kundagol also comes under the core area of Western Chalukya Empire. The existence of  11th century Shri Shambhulingeshwara temple supports this claim. Prior to 1948, Kundgol was a non-contiguous part of the princely state of Jamkhandi.

Hindustani music and Kundgol

 Pandit Sawai Gandharva

Rambhau Kundgolkar, popularly known as Sawai Gandharva, was born here in 1886.

 Bharat Ratna Pandit Bhimsen Joshi

Pandit Bhimsen Joshi travelled all over the country looking for an elusive guru. Finally a musician advised him to return home as the best guru was actually very near to his home, Sawai Gandharva in Kundgol. At first the guru rejected Joshi saying his voice is not good but, finally agreed to take him after seeing his determination and thirst for music.

According to Gangubai Hangal,  Late Abdul Karim Khan visited Dharwad in 1900 and taught Sawai Gandharva, a guru who produced many great disciplines like Dr Hangal and Pandit Bhimsen Joshi. The Nadgir family of Kundgol is known for patronising Hindustani music.

To cater to the needs of cultural activities the Dharwad city boasts of an opera house  Savai  Gandharava Natyagraha 
named after the great Hindustani Musician  Savai Gandharva the native of Kundgol town near Hubli, on the Hubli - Bangalore rail line. The great celebrity in Hindustani music of the modern times. Dr. Smt. Gangubai Hangal also
hails  from this place and  a resident of Hubli.

 Dr. Smt. Gangubai Hangal 
was born in the family of musicians on 5 March 1913 at Dharwad. Her mother
Smt Ambabai was a renowned carnatic singer and father Sri Chikkurao Nadiger of Ranebennur was
an agriculturist. Dr Gangubai was Initiated into music by her mother.
She learnt music under the guidance of Sri Krishnamacharya Hulgur and later under Sri Sawai Gandharv
alias Sri Rambhau Kundgolkar a disciple of late Ustad Abdul Karim Khan, the main architect of kirana gharana
school of music.

Tourism

 Shambhulinga Temple

At Kundgol there is a huge Shiva temple from the 11th century called Shri Shambhulingeshwara Temple, built by Western Chalukyas. It is built with highly polished stones, which are dovetailed into one another. The carvings and images on the pillars are well cut.

On the side of the door steps of the temple, carvings of the Lion face a long scroll issuing from its mouth.

This temple is dedicated to Lord Shiva and Parvati. Although damaged, the exterior of the temple is decorated with lotus and kirtimukha faces and apparently hundreds of Brahmanical images.

This temple was a victim of Muhammadans. It was repaired by a former chief (During 1808-9).

Geography
It has an average elevation of 615 metres (2017 feet).

Demographics
 India census, Kundgol had a population of 16,837. Males constitute 51% of the population and females 49%. Kundgol has an average literacy rate of 64%, higher than the national average of 59.5%: male literacy is 73%, and female literacy is 54%. In Kundgol, 12% of the population is under 6 years of age.

Kundgol Religion Data 2011 
Population, 18,726

Hindu, 74.11%

Muslim, 25.21%

www.census2011.co.in

Transport
There are KSRTC buses from Hubli and Dharwad and nearest towns to Kundagol. This town is also connected by Railway network and its Railway Station code is KNO.

See also

 Western Chalukya
 Western Chalukya temples
 Lakshmeshwar
 Lakkundi
 Gadag
 Annigeri
 Dambal

External links
 Kundgol Shambulingeshwara temple on Google Maps
1. SAMAVASARAN (Research Articles-2015), Dr. Appanna N. Hanje, Vidyashree Prakashan, Alagawadi. Cell-9886592927

References

Buildings and structures completed in the 11th century
Hindu temples in Dharwad district
History of Karnataka
Chalukya dynasty
Shiva temples in Karnataka
Cities and towns in Dharwad district